

Events

Pre-1600
19 – The Roman general Germanicus dies near Antioch. He was convinced that the mysterious illness that ended in his death was a result of poisoning by the Syrian governor Gnaeus Calpurnius Piso, whom he had ordered to leave the province. 
 766 – Emperor Constantine V humiliates nineteen high-ranking officials, after discovering a plot against him. He executes the leaders, Constantine Podopagouros and his brother Strategios.
1248 – The Dutch city of Ommen receives city rights and fortification rights from Otto III, the Archbishop of Utrecht.
1258 – Regent George Mouzalon and his brothers are killed during a coup headed by the aristocratic faction under Michael VIII Palaiologos, paving the way for its leader to ultimately usurp the throne of the Empire of Nicaea.
1270 – Philip III, although suffering from dysentery, becomes King of France following the death of his father Louis IX, during the Eighth Crusade. His uncle, Charles I of Naples, is forced to begin peace negotiations with Muhammad I al-Mustansir, Hafsid Sultan of Tunis.
1537 – The Honourable Artillery Company, the oldest surviving regiment in the British Army, and the second most senior, is formed.
1543 – António Mota and a few companions become the first Europeans to visit Japan. 
1580 – War of the Portuguese Succession: Spanish victory at the Battle of Alcântara brings about the Iberian Union.

1601–1900
1609 – Galileo Galilei demonstrates his first telescope to Venetian lawmakers.
1630 – Portuguese forces are defeated by the Kingdom of Kandy at the Battle of Randeniwela in Sri Lanka.
1758 – Seven Years' War: Frederick II of Prussia defeats the Russian army at the Battle of Zorndorf.
1814 – War of 1812: On the second day of the Burning of Washington, British troops torch the Library of Congress, United States Treasury, Department of War, and other public buildings.
1823 – American fur trapper Hugh Glass is mauled by a grizzly bear while on an expedition in South Dakota.
1825 – The Thirty-Three Orientals declare the independence of Uruguay from Brazil.
1830 – The Belgian Revolution begins.
1835 – The first Great Moon Hoax article is published in The New York Sun, announcing the discovery of life and civilization on the Moon.
1875 – Captain Matthew Webb becomes the first person to swim across the English Channel, traveling from Dover, England, to Calais, France, in 21 hours and 45 minutes.
1883 – France and Viet Nam sign the Treaty of Huế, recognizing a French protectorate over Annam and Tonkin. 
1894 – Kitasato Shibasaburō discovers the infectious agent of the bubonic plague and publishes his findings in The Lancet.
1898 – Seven hundred Greek civilians, 17 British guards and the British Consul of Crete are killed by a Turkish mob in Heraklion, Greece.

1901–present
1904 – Russo-Japanese War: The Battle of Liaoyang begins.
1912 – The Kuomintang is founded for the first time in Peking.
1914 – World War I: Japan declares war on Austria-Hungary.
  1914   – World War I: The library of the Catholic University of Leuven is deliberately destroyed by the German Army. Hundreds of thousands of irreplaceable volumes and Gothic and Renaissance manuscripts are lost.
1916 – The United States National Park Service is created.
1920 – Polish–Soviet War: Battle of Warsaw, which began on August 13, ends with the Red Army's defeat.
1933 – The Diexi earthquake strikes Mao County, Sichuan, China and kills 9,000 people.
1939 – The United Kingdom and Poland form a military alliance in which the UK promises to defend Poland in case of invasion by a foreign power.
1940 – World War II: The first Bombing of Berlin by the British Royal Air Force.
  1941   – World War II: Anglo-Soviet invasion of Iran: The United Kingdom and the Soviet Union jointly stage an invasion of the Imperial State of Iran.
1942 – World War II: Second day of the Battle of the Eastern Solomons; a Japanese naval transport convoy headed towards Guadalcanal is turned back by an Allied air attack.
  1942   – World War II: Battle of Milne Bay: Japanese marines assault Allied airfields at Milne Bay, New Guinea, initiating the Battle of Milne Bay.
1944 – World War II: Paris is liberated by the Allies.
1945 – Ten days after World War II ends with Japan announcing its surrender, armed supporters of the Chinese Communist Party kill U.S. intelligence officer John Birch, regarded by some of the American right as the first victim of the Cold War.
  1945   – The August Revolution ends as Emperor Bảo Đại abdicates, ending the Nguyễn dynasty.
1948 – The House Un-American Activities Committee holds first-ever televised congressional hearing: "Confrontation Day" between Whittaker Chambers and Alger Hiss.
1950 – To avert a threatened strike during the Korean War, President Truman orders Secretary of the Army Frank Pace to seize control of the nation's railroads.
1958 – The world’s first publicly marketed instant noodles,  Chikin Ramen, are introduced by Taiwanese-Japanese businessman Momofuku Ando.
1960 – The Games of the XVII Olympiad commence in Rome, Italy.
1961 – President Jânio Quadros of Brazil resigns after just seven months in power, initiating a political crisis that culminates in a military coup in 1964.
1967 – George Lincoln Rockwell, founder of the American Nazi Party, is assassinated by a former member of his group.
1980 – Zimbabwe joins the United Nations.
1981 – Voyager 2 spacecraft makes its closest approach to Saturn.
1985 – Bar Harbor Airlines Flight 1808 crashes near Auburn, Maine, killing all eight people on board including peace activist and child actress Samantha Smith.
1989 – Voyager 2 spacecraft makes its closest approach to Neptune, the last planet in the Solar System at the time, due to Pluto being within Neptune's orbit from 1979 to 1999.
  1989   – Pakistan International Airlines Flight 404, carrying 54 people, disappears over the Himalayas after take off from Gilgit Airport in Pakistan. The aircraft was never found.
1991 – Belarus gains its independence from the Soviet Union.
  1991   – The Battle of Vukovar begins. An 87-day siege of Vukovar by the Yugoslav People's Army (JNA), supported by various Serb paramilitary forces, between August and November 1991 (during the Croatian War of Independence).
  1991   – Linus Torvalds announces the first version of what will become Linux.
1997 – Egon Krenz, the former East German leader, is convicted of a shoot-to-kill policy at the Berlin Wall.
2001 – American singer Aaliyah and several members of her record company are killed as their overloaded aircraft crashes shortly after takeoff from Marsh Harbour Airport, Bahamas.
2003 – NASA successfully launches the Spitzer Space Telescope into space.
2005 – Hurricane Katrina makes landfall in Florida.
2006 – Former Prime Minister of Ukraine Pavlo Lazarenko is sentenced to nine years imprisonment for money laundering, wire fraud, and extortion.
2011 – Fifty-two people are killed during an arson attack caused by members of the drug cartel Los Zetas.
2012 – Voyager 1 spacecraft enters interstellar space becoming the first man-made object to do so.
2017 – Hurricane Harvey makes landfall in Texas as a powerful Category 4 hurricane, the strongest hurricane to make landfall in the United States since 2004. Over the next few days, the storm causes catastrophic flooding throughout much of eastern Texas, killing 106 people and causing $125 billion in damage.
  2017   – Conflict in Rakhine State (2016–present): One hundred seventy people are killed in at least 26 separate attacks carried out by the Arakan Rohingya Salvation Army, leading to the governments of Myanmar and Malaysia designating the group as a terrorist organisation.

Births

Pre-1600
1467 – Francisco Fernández de la Cueva, 2nd Duke of Alburquerque, Spanish duke (d. 1526)
1491 – Innocenzo Cybo, Italian cardinal (d. 1550)
1509 – Ippolito II d'Este, Italian cardinal and statesman (d. 1572)
1530 – Ivan the Terrible, Russian ruler (d. 1584)
1540 – Lady Catherine Grey, English noblewoman (d. 1568)
1561 – Philippe van Lansberge, Dutch astronomer and mathematician (d. 1632)

1601–1900
1605 – Philipp Moritz, Count of Hanau-Münzenberg, German noble (d. 1638)
1624 – François de la Chaise, French priest (d. 1709)
1662 – John Leverett the Younger, American lawyer, academic, and politician (d. 1724)
1707 – Louis I of Spain (d. 1724)
1724 – George Stubbs, English painter and academic (d. 1806)
1741 – Karl Friedrich Bahrdt, German theologian and author (d. 1792)
1744 – Johann Gottfried Herder, German poet, philosopher, and critic (d. 1803)
1758 – Franz Teyber, Austrian organist and composer (d. 1810)
1767 – Louis Antoine de Saint-Just, French soldier and politician (d. 1794)
1776 – Thomas Bladen Capel, English admiral (d. 1853)
1786 – Ludwig I of Bavaria, King of Bavaria (d. 1868)
1793 – John Neal, American writer, critic, editor, lecturer, and activist (d. 1876)
1796 – James Lick, American carpenter and piano builder (d. 1876)
1802 – Nikolaus Lenau, Romanian-Austrian poet and author (d. 1850)
1803 – Luís Alves de Lima e Silva, Duke of Caxias (d. 1880)
1812 – Nikolay Zinin, Russian organic chemist (d. 1880)
1817 – Marie-Eugénie de Jésus, French nun and saint, founded the Religious of the Assumption (d. 1898)
1819 – Allan Pinkerton, Scottish-American detective and spy (d. 1884)
1829 – Carlo Acton, Italian pianist and composer (d. 1909)
1836 – Bret Harte, American short story writer and poet (d. 1902)
1840 – George C. Magoun, American businessman (d. 1893)
1841 – Emil Theodor Kocher, Swiss physician and academic, Nobel Prize laureate (d. 1917)
1845 – Ludwig II of Bavaria, King of Bavaria (d. 1886)
1850 – Charles Richet, French physiologist and occultist, Nobel Prize laureate (d. 1935)
1867 – James W. Gerard, American lawyer and diplomat, United States Ambassador to Germany (d. 1951)
1869 – Tom Kiely, British-Irish decathlete (d. 1951)
1877 – Joshua Lionel Cowen, American businessman, co-founded the Lionel Corporation (d. 1965)
1878 – Ted Birnie, English footballer and manager (d. 1935)
1882 – Seán T. O'Kelly, Irish journalist and politician, 2nd President of Ireland (d. 1966)
1889 – Alexander Mair, Australian politician, 26th Premier of New South Wales (d. 1969)
1891 – David Shimoni, Belarusian-Israeli poet and translator (d. 1956)
1893 – Henry Trendley Dean, American dentist (d. 1962)
1898 – Helmut Hasse, German mathematician and academic (d. 1975)
  1898   – Arthur Wood, English cricketer (d. 1973)
1899 – Paul Herman Buck, American historian and author (d. 1978)
1900 – Isobel Hogg Kerr Beattie, Scottish architect (d. 1970) 
  1900   – Hans Adolf Krebs, German physician and biochemist, Nobel Prize laureate (d. 1981)

1901–present
1902 – Stefan Wolpe, German-American composer and educator (d. 1972)
1903 – Arpad Elo, Hungarian-American chess player, created the Elo rating system (d. 1992)
1905 – Faustina Kowalska, Polish nun and saint (d. 1938)
1906 – Jim Smith, English cricketer (d. 1979)
1909 – Ruby Keeler, Canadian-American actress, singer, and dancer (d. 1993)
  1909   – Michael Rennie, English actor and producer (d. 1971)
1910 – George Cisar, American baseball player (d. 2010)
  1910   – Dorothea Tanning, American painter, sculptor, and poet (d. 2012)
1911 – Võ Nguyên Giáp, Vietnamese general and politician, 3rd Minister of Defence for Vietnam (d. 2013)
1912 – Erich Honecker, German politician (d. 1994)
1913 – Don DeFore, American actor (d. 1993)
  1913   – Walt Kelly, American illustrator and animator (d. 1973)
1916 – Van Johnson, American actor (d. 2008)
  1916   – Frederick Chapman Robbins, American pediatrician and virologist, Nobel Prize laureate (d. 2003)
  1916   – Saburō Sakai, Japanese lieutenant and pilot (d. 2000)
1917 – Mel Ferrer, American actor, director, and producer (d. 2008)
1918 – Leonard Bernstein, American pianist, composer, and conductor (d. 1990)
  1918   – Richard Greene, English actor (d. 1985)
1919 – William P. Foster, American bandleader and educator (d. 2010)
  1919   – George Wallace, American lawyer, and politician, 45th Governor of Alabama (d. 1998)
  1919   – Jaap Rijks, Dutch Olympic medalist (d. 2017)
1921 – Monty Hall, Canadian television personality and game show host (d. 2017)
  1921   – Bryce Mackasey, Canadian businessman and politician, 20th Canadian Minister of Labour (d. 1999)
  1921   – Brian Moore, Northern Irish-Canadian author and screenwriter (d. 1999)
1923 – Álvaro Mutis, Colombian-Mexican author and poet (d. 2013)
  1923   – Allyre Sirois, Canadian lawyer and judge (d. 2012)
1924 – Zsuzsa Körmöczy, Hungarian tennis player and coach (d. 2006)
1925 – Thea Astley, Australian journalist and author (d. 2004)
  1925   – Hilmar Hoffmann, German film and culture academic (d. 2018)
  1925   – Stepas Butautas, Lithuanian basketball player and coach (d. 2001)
1927 – Althea Gibson, American tennis player and golfer (d. 2003)
  1927   – Des Renford, Australian swimmer (d. 1999)
1928 – John "Kayo" Dottley, American football player (d. 2018)
  1928   – Darrell Johnson, American baseball player, coach, and manager (d. 2004)
  1928   – Karl Korte, American composer and academic (d. 2022)
  1928   – Herbert Kroemer, German-American physicist, engineer, and academic, Nobel Prize laureate
1930 – Sean Connery, Scottish actor and producer (d. 2020)
  1930   – György Enyedi, Hungarian economist and geographer (d. 2012)
  1930   – Graham Jarvis, Canadian actor (d. 2003)
  1930   – Crispin Tickell, English academic and diplomat, British Permanent Representative to the United Nations (d. 2022)
1931 – Regis Philbin, American actor and television host (d. 2020)
1932 – Anatoly Kartashov, Soviet aviator and cosmonaut (d. 2005)
1933 – Patrick F. McManus, American journalist and author (d. 2018)
  1933   – Wayne Shorter, American saxophonist and composer (d. 2023)
  1933   – Tom Skerritt, American actor 
1934 – Lise Bacon, Canadian judge and politician, Deputy Premier of Quebec
  1934   – Eddie Ilarde, Filipino journalist and politician (d. 2020)
1935 – Charles Wright, American poet 
1936 – Giridharilal Kedia, Indian businessman, founded the Image Institute of Technology & Management (d. 2009)
1937 – Jimmy Hannan, Australian television host and singer (d. 2019)
  1937   – Virginia Euwer Wolff, American author
1938 – David Canary, American actor (d. 2015)
  1938   – Frederick Forsyth, English journalist and author
1939 – John Badham, English-American actor, director, and producer
1940 – Wilhelm von Homburg, German boxer and actor (d. 2004)
1941 – Marshall Brickman, Brazilian-American director, producer, and screenwriter
  1941   – Mario Corso, Italian footballer and coach (d. 2020)
  1941   – Ludwig Müller, German footballer (d. 2021)
1942 – Nathan Deal, American lawyer, and politician, 82nd Governor of Georgia
1944 – Conrad Black, Canadian historian and author
  1944   – Jacques Demers, Canadian ice hockey player, coach, and politician
  1944   – Anthony Heald, American actor
  1944   – Andrew Longmore, British lawyer and judge
1945 – Daniel Hulet, Belgian cartoonist (d. 2011)
  1945   – Hannah Louise Shearer, American screenwriter and producer
1946 – Rollie Fingers, American baseball player
  1946   – Charles Ghigna, American poet and author
  1946   – Charlie Sanders, American football player and sportscaster (d. 2015)
1947 – Michael Kaluta, American author and illustrator
  1947   – Keith Tippett, British jazz pianist and composer (d. 2020)
1948 – Ledward Kaapana, American singer and guitarist
  1948   – Nicholas A. Peppas, Greek chemist and biologist
1949 – Martin Amis, British novelist
  1949   – Rijkman Groenink, Dutch banker and academic
  1949   – John Savage, American actor and producer
  1949   – Gene Simmons, Israeli-American singer-songwriter, producer, and actor 
1950 – Willy DeVille, American singer and songwriter (d. 2009)
  1950   – Charles Fambrough, American bassist, composer, and producer (d. 2011)
1951 – Rob Halford, English heavy metal singer-songwriter
  1951   – Bill Handel, Brazilian-American lawyer and radio host
1952 – Kurban Berdyev, Turkmen footballer and manager 
  1952   – Geoff Downes, English keyboard player, songwriter, and producer 
  1952   – Duleep Mendis, Sri Lankan cricketer and coach
1954 – Elvis Costello, English singer-songwriter, guitarist, and producer
  1954   – Jim Wallace, Baron Wallace of Tankerness, Scottish lawyer and politician, First Minister of Scotland
1955 – John McGeoch, Scottish guitarist (d. 2004)
  1955   – Gerd Müller, German businessman and politician
1956 – Matt Aitken, English songwriter and record producer
  1956   – Takeshi Okada, Japanese footballer, coach, and manager
  1956   – Henri Toivonen, Finnish race car driver (d. 1986)
1957 – Sikander Bakht, Pakistani cricketer and sportscaster
  1957   – Simon McBurney, English actor and director
  1957   – Frank Serratore, American ice hockey player and coach
1958 – Tim Burton, American director, producer, and screenwriter
1959 – Ian Falconer, American author and illustrator
  1959   – Steve Levy, American lawyer and politician
  1959   – Bernardo Rezende, Brazilian volleyball coach and player
  1959   – Lane Smith, American author and illustrator
  1959   – Ruth Ann Swenson, American soprano and actress
1960 – Georg Zellhofer, Austrian footballer and manager
1961 – Billy Ray Cyrus, American singer-songwriter, guitarist, and actor
  1961   – Joanne Whalley, English actress
1962 – Taslima Nasrin, Bangladeshi author
  1962   – Theresa Andrews, American competition swimmer and Olympic champion
  1962   – Vivian Campbell, Northern Irish rock guitarist and songwriter 
  1962   – Michael Zorc, German footballer 
1963 – Miro Cerar, Slovenian lawyer and politician, 8th Prime Minister of Slovenia
  1963   – Shock G, American rapper and producer (d. 2021)
  1963   – Tiina Intelmann, Estonian lawyer and diplomat
1964 – Azmin Ali, Malaysian mathematician and politician
  1964   – Maxim Kontsevich, Russian-American mathematician and academic
  1964   – Blair Underwood, American actor
1965 – Cornelius Bennett, American football player
  1965   – Sanjeev Sharma, Indian cricketer and coach
  1965   – Mia Zapata, American singer (d. 1993)
1966 – Albert Belle, American baseball player
  1966   – Derek Sherinian, American keyboard player, songwriter, and producer 
  1966   – Terminator X, American hip-hop DJ
1967 – Jeff Tweedy, American singer-songwriter, musician, and producer 
1968 – Yuri Mitsui, Japanese actress, model, and race car driver
  1968   – Stuart Murdoch, Scottish singer-songwriter 
  1968   – Spider One, American singer-songwriter and producer 
  1968   – Rachael Ray, American chef, author, and television host
  1968   – Takeshi Ueda, Japanese singer-songwriter and bass player 
1969 – Olga Konkova, Norwegian-Russian pianist and composer
  1969   – Cameron Mathison, Canadian actor and television personality
  1969   – Catriona Matthew, Scottish golfer
  1969   – Vivek Razdan, Indian cricketer, coach, and sportscaster
1970 – Doug Glanville, American baseball player and sportscaster
  1970   – Debbie Graham, American tennis player
  1970   – Robert Horry, American basketball player and sportscaster
  1970   – Adrian Lam, Papua New Guinean-Australian rugby league player and coach
  1970   – Jo Dee Messina, American singer-songwriter
  1970   – Claudia Schiffer, German model and fashion designer
1971 – Jason Death, Australian rugby league player 
1973 – Fatih Akın, German director, producer, and screenwriter
1974 – Pablo Ozuna, Dominican baseball player
1975 – Brad Drew, Australian rugby league player
  1975   – Petria Thomas, Australian swimmer and coach
1976 – Javed Qadeer, Pakistani cricketer and coach
  1976   – Alexander Skarsgård, Swedish actor
1977 – Masumi Asano, Japanese voice actress and producer
  1977   – Andy McDonald, Canadian ice hockey player
1978 – Kel Mitchell, American actor, producer, and screenwriter
  1978   – Robert Mohr, German rugby player
1979 – Marlon Harewood, English footballer
  1979   – Philipp Mißfelder, German historian and politician (d. 2015)
  1979   – Deanna Nolan, American basketball player
1981 – Rachel Bilson, American actress
  1981   – Jan-Berrie Burger, Namibian cricketer
  1981   – Camille Pin, French tennis player
1982 – Jung Jung-suk, South Korean footballer (d. 2011)
1983 – James Rossiter, English race car driver
1984 – Florian Mohr, German footballer
  1984   – Anya Monzikova, Russian-American model and actress
1986 – Rodney Ferguson, American footballer
1987 – Stacey Farber, Canadian actress
  1987   – Velimir Jovanović, Serbian footballer
  1987   – Blake Lively, American model and actress
  1987   – Amy Macdonald, Scottish singer-songwriter and guitarist
  1987   – Justin Upton, American baseball player
  1987   – Adam Warren, American baseball player
  1987   – James Wesolowski, Australian footballer
1988 – Angela Park, Brazilian-American golfer
1988     – Giga Chikadze, Georgian mixed martial artist and kickboxer
1989 – Hiram Mier, Mexican footballer
1992 – Miyabi Natsuyaki, Japanese singer and actress 
  1992   – Ricardo Rodriguez, Swiss footballer
1994 – Edmunds Augstkalns, Latvian ice hockey player
1998 – China Anne McClain, American actress and singer

Deaths

Pre-1600
AD 79 – Pliny the Elder, Roman commander and philosopher (b. 23)
 274 – Yang Yan, Jin Dynasty empress (b. 238)
 306 – Saint Maginus,  Christian hermit and martyr from Tarragona
383 – Gratian, Roman emperor (b. 359)
 471 – Gennadius I, patriarch of Constantinople
 766 – Constantine Podopagouros, Byzantine official
   766   – Strategios Podopagouros, Byzantine general
 985 – Dietrich of Haldensleben, German margrave
1091 – Sisnando Davides, military leader
1192 – Hugh III, Duke of Burgundy (b. 1142)
1258 – George Mouzalon, regent of the Empire of Nicaea
1270 – Louis IX of France (b. 1214)
  1270   – Alphonso of Brienne (b. c. 1225)
1271 – Joan, Countess of Toulouse (b. 1220)
1282 – Thomas de Cantilupe, English bishop and saint (b. 1218)
1322 – Beatrice of Silesia, queen consort of Germany (b. c. 1292)
1327 – Demasq Kaja, Chobanid
1330 – Sir James Douglas, Scottish guerrilla leader (b. 1286)
1339 – Henry de Cobham, 1st Baron Cobham (b. 1260)
1368 – Andrea Orcagna, Italian painter, sculptor, and architect
1482 – Margaret of Anjou (b. 1429)
1485 – William Catesby, supporter of Richard III (b. 1450)
1554 – Thomas Howard, 3rd Duke of Norfolk, English soldier and politician, Lord High Treasurer (b. 1473)
1592 – William IV, Landgrave of Hesse-Kassel (b. 1532)

1601–1900
1603 – Ahmad al-Mansur, Sultan of the Saadi dynasty (b. 1549)
1631 – Nicholas Hyde, Lord Chief Justice of England (b.c. 1572)
1632 – Thomas Dekker, English author and playwright (b. 1572)
1688 – Henry Morgan, Welsh admiral and politician, Lieutenant Governor of Jamaica (b. 1635)
1699 – Christian V of Denmark (b. 1646)
1711 – Edward Villiers, 1st Earl of Jersey, English politician, Secretary of State for the Southern Department (b. 1656)
1742 – Carlos Seixas, Portuguese organist and composer (b. 1704)
1774 – Niccolò Jommelli, Italian composer and educator (b. 1714)
1776 – David Hume, Scottish economist, historian, and philosopher (b. 1711)
1794 – Florimond Claude, Comte de Mercy-Argenteau, Belgian-Austrian diplomat (b. 1727)
1797 – Thomas Chittenden, Governor of the Vermont Republic (later 1st Governor of the State of Vermont) (b. 1730)
1819 – James Watt, Scottish-English engineer and instrument maker (b. 1736)
1822 – William Herschel, German-English astronomer and composer (b. 1738)
1867 – Michael Faraday, English physicist and chemist (b. 1791)
1882 – Friedrich Reinhold Kreutzwald, Estonian physician and author (b. 1803)
1886 – Zinovios Valvis, Greek lawyer and politician, 35th Prime Minister of Greece (b. 1791)
1892 – William Champ, English-Australian politician, 1st Premier of Tasmania (b. 1808)
1900 – Friedrich Nietzsche, German philologist, philosopher, and critic (b. 1844)

1901–present
1904 – Henri Fantin-Latour, French painter and lithographer (b. 1836)
1908 – Henri Becquerel, French physicist and chemist, Nobel Prize laureate (b. 1852)
1916 – Mary Tappan Wright, American novelist and short story writer (b. 1851)
1921 – Nikolay Gumilyov, Russian poet and critic (b. 1886)
1924 – Mariano Álvarez, Filipino general and politician (b. 1818)
  1924   – Velma Caldwell Melville, American editor, and writer of prose and poetry (b. 1858)
1925 – Franz Conrad von Hötzendorf, Austrian field marshal (b. 1852)
1930 – Frankie Campbell, American boxer (b. 1904)
1931 – Dorothea Fairbridge, South African author and co-founder of Guild of Loyal Women (b. 1862)
1936 – Juliette Adam, French author (b. 1836)
1938 – Aleksandr Kuprin, Russian pilot, explorer, and author (b. 1870)
1939 – Babe Siebert, Canadian ice hockey player and coach (b. 1904)
1940 – Prince Jean, Duke of Guise (b. 1874)
1942 – Prince George, Duke of Kent (b. 1902)
1945 – John Birch, American soldier and missionary (b. 1918)
1956 – Alfred Kinsey, American biologist and academic (b. 1894)
1965 – Moonlight Graham, American baseball player and physician (b. 1879)
1966 – Lao She, Chinese novelist and dramatist (b. 1899)
1967 – Stanley Bruce, Australian lawyer and politician, 8th Prime Minister of Australia (b. 1883)
  1967   – Oscar Cabalén, Argentine race car driver (b. 1928)
  1967   – Paul Muni, Ukrainian-born American actor (b. 1895)
  1967   – George Lincoln Rockwell, American commander, politician, and activist, founded the American Nazi Party (b. 1918)
1968 – Stan McCabe, Australian cricketer and coach (b. 1910)
1969 – Robert Cosgrove, Australian politician, 30th Premier of Tasmania (b. 1884)
1970 – Tachū Naitō, Japanese architect and engineer, designed the Tokyo Tower (b. 1886)
1971 – Ted Lewis, American singer and clarinet player (b. 1890)
1973 – Dezső Pattantyús-Ábrahám, Hungarian lawyer and politician, Prime Minister of Hungary (b. 1875)
1976 – Eyvind Johnson, Swedish novelist and short story writer, Nobel Prize laureate (b. 1900)
1977 – Károly Kós, Hungarian architect, ethnologist, and politician (b. 1883)
1979 – Stan Kenton, American pianist, composer, and bandleader (b. 1911)
1980 – Gower Champion, American dancer and choreographer (b. 1919)
1981 – Nassos Kedrakas, Greek actor and cinematographer (b. 1915)
1982 – Anna German, Polish singer (b. 1936)
1984 – Truman Capote, American novelist, playwright, and screenwriter (b. 1924)
  1984   – Viktor Chukarin, Ukrainian gymnast and coach (b. 1921)
  1984   – Waite Hoyt, American baseball player and sportscaster (b. 1899)
1988 – Art Rooney, American businessman, founded the Pittsburgh Steelers (b. 1901)
1990 – Morley Callaghan, Canadian author and playwright (b. 1903)
1995 – Doug Stegmeyer, American bass player and producer (b. 1951)
1998 – Lewis F. Powell, Jr., American lawyer and Supreme Court justice (b. 1907)
1999 – Rob Fisher, English keyboard player and songwriter (b. 1956)
2000 – Carl Barks, American author and illustrator (b. 1901)
  2000   – Frederick C. Bock, American soldier and pilot (b. 1918)
  2000   – Jack Nitzsche, American pianist, composer, and producer (b. 1937)
  2000   – Allen Woody, American bass player and songwriter  (b. 1955)
2001 – Aaliyah, American singer and actress (b. 1979)
  2001   – Carl Brewer, Canadian ice hockey player (b. 1938)
  2001   – Üzeyir Garih, Turkish engineer and businessman, co-founded Alarko Holding (b. 1929)
  2001   – Ken Tyrrell, English race car driver and businessman, founded Tyrrell Racing (b. 1924)
2002 – Dorothy Hewett, Australian author and poet (b. 1923)
2003 – Tom Feelings, American author and illustrator (b. 1933)
2005 – Peter Glotz, Czech-German academic and politician (b. 1939)
2006 – Noor Hassanali, Trinidadian-Tobagonian lawyer and politician, 2nd President of Trinidad and Tobago (b. 1918)
2007 – Benjamin Aaron, American lawyer and scholar (b. 1915)
  2007   – Ray Jones, English footballer (b. 1988)
2008 – Ahmad Faraz, Pakistani poet (b. 1931)
  2008   – Kevin Duckworth, American basketball player (b. 1964)
2009 – Ted Kennedy, American politician (b. 1932)
  2009   – Mandé Sidibé, Malian economist and politician, Prime Minister of Mali (b. 1940)
2011 – Lazar Mojsov, Macedonian politician (b. 1920)
2012 – Florencio Amarilla, Paraguayan footballer, coach, and actor (b. 1935)
  2012   – Neil Armstrong, American pilot, engineer, and astronaut (b. 1930)
  2012   – Roberto González Barrera, Mexican banker and businessman (b. 1930)
  2012   – Donald Gorrie, Scottish politician (b. 1933)
2013 – Ciril Bergles, Slovene poet and translator (b. 1934)
  2013   – António Borges, Portuguese economist and banker (b. 1949)
  2013   – William Froug, American screenwriter and producer (b. 1922)
  2013   – Liu Fuzhi, Chinese academic and politician, 3rd Minister of Justice for China (b. 1917)
  2013   – Raghunath Panigrahi, Indian singer-songwriter (b. 1932)
  2013   – Gylmar dos Santos Neves, Brazilian footballer (b. 1930)
2014 – William Greaves, American director and producer (b. 1926)
  2014   – Marcel Masse, Canadian educator and politician, 29th Canadian Minister of National Defence (b. 1936)
  2014   – Nico M. M. Nibbering, Dutch chemist and academic (b. 1938)
  2014   – Uziah Thompson, Jamaican-American drummer and producer (b. 1936)
  2014   – Enrique Zileri, Peruvian journalist and publisher (b. 1931)
2015 – José María Benegas, Spanish lawyer and politician (b. 1948)
  2015   – Francis Sejersted, Norwegian historian and academic (b. 1936)
2016 – Marvin Kaplan, American actor (b. 1927)
2017 – Rich Piana, American bodybuilder (b. 1971)
2018 – John McCain, American politician (b. 1936)
2019 – Ferdinand Piëch, Austrian business magnate and engineer (b. 1937) 
2022 – Mable John, American blues vocalist (b. 1930)

Holidays and observances
 Christian feast day:
 Æbbe of Coldingham
 Aredius
 Genesius of Arles
 Genesius of Rome
 Ginés de la Jara (or Genesius of Cartagena)
 Gregory of Utrecht
 Joseph Calasanz
 Louis IX of France
 Blessed Ludovicus Baba
 Blessed Ludovicus Sasada
 Blessed Luis Sotelo
 Menas of Constantinople
 Blessed Miguel de Carvalho
 Patricia of Naples
 Blessed Pedro Vásquez
 Thomas de Cantilupe (or of Hereford)
August 25 (Eastern Orthodox liturgics)
 Day of Songun (North Korea)
 Independence Day, celebrates the independence of Uruguay from Brazil in 1825.
 Soldier's Day (Brazil)

References

External links

 
 
 

Days of the year
August